The United States U-23 women's national soccer team is a youth soccer team operated under the auspices of U.S. Soccer.  Its primary role is the development of players in preparation for the full Women's National Team.  The team competes in a variety of competitions, including the annual Nordic Cup, which is the top competition for this age group.

History

Beginnings as a U-20 program
The United States U-23 team has been active since 1989, however it was run as a U-20 team from its inception until 1998.  Its main goal was to prepare college players for the step up to international soccer.  Women had no viable opportunities to enhance their playing abilities, aside from overseas, since the United States lacked a top-level domestic league during this time.

The switch to U-21
In 1998, United States Soccer Federation decided to make the team a U-21 team in order to give women a higher level of play to better prepare them for the full National Team.  In accordance with this strategy, the U-21 team frequently rostered "over-aged" players in the U-21 training camps, as well as the Nordic Cup.  It remained a U-21 team from 1998 through 2008.

Competing as a U-23 team
2008 saw the change of the USA's oldest youth national team moved to the U-23 level.  The move was made by the United States Soccer Federation in response to age-level changes FIFA had made to its oldest women's youth competition, now named FIFA U-20 Women's World Cup.  The age limit was raised from being a U-19 tournament to a U-20 tournament.  This change, coupled with a newly introduced U-23 age limit to the Nordic Cup, prompted the USSF to rethink and eventually change the youth development team.  The team continues to serve as a stepping-stone for collegiate and post-collegiate players to the United States Women's National Team.  Additionally, many U-23 players develop further through the National Women's Soccer League.  While many of the post-collegiate players play in this league to develop their game, the U-23's turned focus on college players who are out of season and may not yet be NWSL-eligible.

Results and schedule
The following is a list of match results from the previous 12 months, as well as any future matches that have been scheduled.

 Legend

Players

Current squad
The following players were named to the squad for the Portland Thorns FC preseason tournament.

Caps and goals are current as of March 18, 2023, after match against Racing Louisville.

Recent call-ups
The following players were named to a squad in the last 12 months.

 February 2023 friendlies

 2022 Women's U-23 Three-Nations Tournament

Coaches
  Jerry Smith (2001–2002)
  Chris Petrucelli (2003–2004)
  Jill Ellis (2005–2006)
  Bill Irwin (2007–2011)
  Randy Waldrum (2012–2013)
  Steve Swanson (2013–2014)
  Janet Rayfield (2015–2016)
  Laura Harvey (2017)
  B. J. Snow (2017–2019)
  Matt Potter (2020–2022)
  Jené Baclawski (2022)
  Carrie Kveton (2023)
  Margueritte Aozasa (2023)

References

Soc
Youth soccer in the United States
North American women's national under-23 association football teams
Women's national under-23 association football teams
U23
U23